Pony Express is a 1953 American Western film directed by Jerry Hopper, filmed in Kanab, Utah, and starring Charlton Heston as Buffalo Bill, Forrest Tucker as Wild Bill Hickok, Jan Sterling as a Calamity Jane-type character, and Rhonda Fleming. The story is largely based on the 1925 silent film The Pony Express while the threat of a Californian secession is taken from Frontier Pony Express (1939).

The film is an historical account of the formation of the Pony Express rapid transcontinental mail delivery in the United States in 1860–1861. Although it gives no credit to the real founders of the Pony Express, Buffalo Bill Cody did ride for them, having signed up when he was 15 years old.

Plot
In 1860, Buffalo Bill and Wild Bill Hickok join forces to establish a mail route from St. Joseph, Missouri, to Sacramento, California. On the way, they battle the weather, hostile Indians and California secessionists intent on shutting the operation down to encourage California to secede from the Union.

Cast
Charlton Heston as William Frederick 'Buffalo Bill' Cody
Rhonda Fleming as Evelyn Hastings
Forrest Tucker as Wild Bill Hickok
Jan Sterling as Denny Russell
Michael Moore as Rance Hastings
Porter Hall as Jim Bridger
Richard Shannon as Red Barrett
Henry Brandon as Joe Cooper
Stuart Randall as Pemberton
Lewis Martin as Sergeant Russell
Pat Hogan as Chief Yellow Hand
 Eric Alden as Miller
 Howard Joslin as Harvey

Production
Charlton Heston did a film tie-in advertisement for Camel cigarettes.

Parts of the film were shot in Kanab Creek, Kanab movie fort, the Gap, and Johnson Canyon in Utah.

See also
 Pony Express, TV series

References

External links

1953 films
1953 Western (genre) films
American Western (genre) films
Cultural depictions of Buffalo Bill
Cultural depictions of Wild Bill Hickok
Films directed by Jerry Hopper
Films shot in Utah
Paramount Pictures films
Sound film remakes of silent films
Works about the Pony Express
Films scored by Paul Sawtell
1950s English-language films
1950s American films